The South Africa's Women's cricket team toured India from 16 to 30 November 2014. The tour consisted of one Test match, three One Day International (ODI) matches and one Twenty20 International (T20I). The ODI games were part of the 2014–16 ICC Women's Championship.

Squads

Tour matches

Practice match: India A Women v South Africa Women

ODI practice match: India A Women v South Africa Women

Test series

Only Test

ODI series

1st ODI

2nd ODI

3rd ODI

T20I series

Only T20I

References

External links
 Series home Page at ESPN Cricinfo

2014–16 ICC Women's Championship
2014–15 Indian women's cricket
International cricket competitions in 2014
India
2014 in South African women's sport
2014 in women's cricket
Women's international cricket tours of India